Symphony No. 24 in B-flat major, K. 182/173dA, is a symphony composed by Wolfgang Amadeus Mozart on October 3, 1773. The symphony is scored for 2 oboes (replaced by 2 flutes in the slow movement), 2 horns, and strings.

He wrote the symphony in three movements:

Allegro spiritoso, 
Andantino grazioso, 
Allegro, 

The autograph score is today located in the Staatsbibliothek zu Berlin Preußischer Kulturbesitz.

References

External links

24
1773 compositions
Compositions in B-flat major